Lottie Dod defeated Edith Cole 6–2, 6–3 in the All Comers' Final, and then defeated the reigning champion Blanche Bingley 6–2, 6–0 in the challenge round to win the ladies' singles tennis title at the 1887 Wimbledon Championships.

Draw

Challenge round

All Comers'

References

External links

Ladies' Singles
Wimbledon Championship by year – Women's singles
Wimbledon Championships - Singles
Wimbledon Championships - Singles